Thelionema is a small genus of tufted perennials in the family Asphodelaceae, subfamily Hemerocallidoideae. All three species, which were previously placed in the genus Stypandra, are native to Australia. These are:

Thelionema caespitosum (R.Br.) R.J.F.Hend. - Tufted Blue-lily
Thelionema grande (C.T.White) R.J.F.Hend. 
Thelionema umbellatum (R.Br.) R.J.F.Hend.

References

Asphodelaceae genera
Hemerocallidoideae
Asparagales of Australia